Pterophorinae is a subfamily of moths in the family Pterophoridae.

Genera and selected species

 Tribe Exelastini
 Genus Antarches
 Genus Arcoptilia
 Genus Exelastis
 Exelastis caroli
 Genus Fuscoptilia
 Genus Marasmarcha
 Tribe Oidaematophorini
 Genus Adaina
 Genus Crassuncus
 Genus Emmelina Tutt, 1905
 Emmelina monodactyla
 Genus Gypsochares
 Genus Hellinsia Tutt, 1905
 Hellinsia balanotes
 Hellinsia emmelinoida
 Genus Helpaphorus
 Genus Karachia
 Genus Oidaematophorus Wallengren, 1862
 Oidaematophorus beneficus
 Genus Paravinculia
 Genus Paulianilus
 Genus Picardia
 Genus Pselnophorus Wallengren, 1881
 Pselnophorus meruensis
 Genus Puerphorus
 Genus Setosipennula
 Tribe Oxyptilini
 Genus Apoxyptilus Alipanah et al., 2010
 Genus Buckleria Tutt, 1905
 Buckleria vanderwolfi
 Genus Capperia
 Genus Crombrugghia
 Genus Dejongia
 Genus Eucapperia
 Eucapperia continentalis
 Genus Geina
 Genus Intercapperia
 Genus Megalorhipida Amsel, 1935
 Megalorrhipida leucodactyla
 Genus Oxyptilus
 Genus Paracapperia
 Genus Prichotilus Rose and Pooni, 2003
 Genus Procapperia
 Genus Pseudoxyptilus Alipanah et al., 2010
 Genus Stangeia Tutt, 1905
 Stangeia xerodes
 Genus Stenodacma
 Genus Tomotilus
 Genus Trichoptilus
 Tribe Platyptiliini
 Genus Amblyptilia Hübner, 1825
 Amblyptilia acanthadactyla
 Genus Anstenoptilia
 Genus Asiaephorus
 Genus Bigotilia
 Genus Bipunctiphorus
 Genus Buszkoiana
 Genus Cnaemidophorus Wallengren, 1862
 Cnaemidophorus rhododactyla
 Genus Crocydoscelus
 Genus Fletcherella
 Genus Gillmeria Tutt, 1905
 Gillmeria ochrodactyla
 Genus Inferuncus
 Genus Koremaguia
 Genus Lantanophaga Zimmermann, 1958
 Lantanophaga pusillidactyla
 Genus Leesi
 Genus Lioptilodes
 Genus Michaelophorus
 Genus Nippoptilia
 Genus Paraamblyptilia
 Genus Paraplatyptilia
 Genus Platyptilia Hübner, 1825
 Platyptilia aarviki
 Platyptilia carduidactyla – artichoke plume moth
 Platyptilia celidotus
 Platyptilia eberti
 Platyptilia falcatalis
 Platyptilia gonodactyla
 Platyptilia nussi
 Genus Platyptiliodes
 Genus Postplatyptilia
 Genus Quadriptilia
 Genus Sinpunctiptilia
 Sinpunctiptilia emissalis
 Genus Sochchora
 Genus Sphenarches
 Genus Stenoptilia Hübner, 1825
 Stenoptilia bipunctidactyla
 Stenoptilia kiitulo
 Stenoptilia pterodactyla
 Stenoptilia zophodactylus
 Genus Stenoptilodes Zimmermann, 1958
 Stenoptilodes antirrhina – snapdragon plume moth
 Genus Stockophorus
 Genus Uroloba
 Genus Vietteilus
 Genus Xyroptila
 Tribe Pterophorini
 Genus Calyciphora
 Genus Chocophorus
 Genus Cosmoclostis
 Cosmoclostis aglaodesma
 Cosmoclostis hemiadelpha
 Cosmoclostis pesseuta
 Genus Diacrotricha
 Genus Imbophorus
 Imbophorus aptalis
 Imbophorus leucophasmus
 Imbophorus pallidus
 Genus Merrifieldia Tutt, 1905
 Genus Oirata
 Genus Patagonophorus
 Genus Porrittia
 Genus Pterophorus Schaeffer, 1766
 Pterophorus pentadactyla – white plume moth
 Genus Septuaginta
 Genus Singularia
 Genus Tabulaephorus
 Genus Wheeleria Tutt, 1905
 Wheeleria spilodactylus
 Tribe Tetraschalini
 Genus Macrotinactis
 Genus Titanoptilus
 Genus Tetraschalis
 Genus Walsinghamiella

References 

 
Moth subfamilies